Minkow is a surname. Notable people with this surname include:

 Aleksandr Vitalyevich Minkov (born 1957), Russian singer, songwriter, and musician
 Marin Minkov, also known as Maxim of Bulgaria (1914-2012), Bulgarian patriarch of the Bulgarian Orthodox Church from 1971 to 2012
 Mark Anatolievich Minkov (1944–2012), Soviet/Russian music composer
 Mihail Minkov (born 1993), Bulgarian professional footballer
 Nikola Minkov (born 1987), Bulgarian footballer
 Nikolay Minkov (born 1997), Bulgarian footballer
 Svetoslav Konstantinov Minkov (1902–1966), Bulgarian absurdist fiction writer